The following is a list of quaestors in ancient Rome, as reported by ancient sources and compiled by Broughton.

The quaestorship was a political office in the Roman cursus honorum. The authenticity of the office prior during the early republic is doubted and quaestorships prior to 446 BC might be fabricated. There are large gaps in the lists of quaestors and only a small percentage of all who held the quaestorship is known. For those who are mentioned by ancient authors to have held the quaestorship during an unknown period, an estimate is provided in the list of the last possible date for such an questorship.

This list is currently incomplete and only contain those who held the quaestorship between 509 - 100 BC.

Unless otherwise noted all information is from Broughton's The Magistrates of the Roman Republic

References

Quaestors